Pool B of the 2015 Rugby World Cup began on 19 September and was completed on 11 October 2015. The pool was composed of South Africa, Samoa and Scotlandwho all qualified automatically for the tournament due to finishing in the top three positions in their pools in 2011joined by the top Asian qualifier, Japan, and the second American qualifier, United States. South Africa and Scotland qualified for the quarter finals.

Overall

All times are local United Kingdom time (UTC+01)

South Africa vs Japan

Notes:
 Fumiaki Tanaka earned his 50th test cap for Japan.	
 This was the first ever match between these nations.
 This was South Africa's first ever loss to a Tier 2 nation.	
 This was Japan's second ever win over one of the SANZAAR nations.
 This match is known as The Brighton Miracle and is featured in the film of the same name.

Samoa vs United States

Scotland vs Japan

Notes:
 Josh Strauss made his international debut for Scotland.

South Africa vs Samoa

Notes:
 Adriaan Strauss earned his 50th test cap for South Africa.
 Census Johnston earned his 50th test cap for Samoa.
 George, Ken and Tusi Pisi became the first set of three brothers to represent and play for one team in one XV, in a Rugby World Cup match.

Scotland vs United States

Samoa vs Japan

Notes:
 This was Japan's largest winning margin over Samoa, surpassing their 19-point winning margin set in 2014.
 Atsushi Hiwasa earned his 50th test cap for Japan.

South Africa vs Scotland

Notes:
 Alasdair Dickinson earned his 50th test cap for Scotland.

South Africa vs United States

Notes:
 Rudy Paige made his international debut for South Africa.	
 Joe Taufete'e made his international debut for the United States.	
 Bryan Habana equaled Jonah Lomu's World Cup record of 15 tries scored in the tournament.

Samoa vs Scotland

Notes:
 Richie Gray earned his 50th test cap for Scotland.
 Sean Lamont became the second Scottish player to earn 100 caps for Scotland.

United States vs Japan

Notes:
 With this win, Japan became the first team to win three pool games and still fail to advance to the knockout stage.

References

External links
 Official RWC 2015 Site

Pool B
World Cup
World Cup
World Cup
World Cup
World Cup